Laniel is an unorganized territory in the Témiscamingue Regional County Municipality, Abitibi-Témiscamingue region, Quebec, Canada. It surrounds the northern portion of Lake Kipawa.

Laniel is also a hamlet located within this territory at the outflow of Lake Kipawa where Route 101 crosses the Kipawa River. It was named in honour of priest Armand Laniel (1866-1928).

Until 2005, Laniel and Lacs-du-Témiscamingue unorganized territories were part of the Rivière-Kipawa unorganized territory.

Demographics
Population:
 Population in 2021: 89
 Population in 2016: 82
 Population in 2011: 69
 Population in 2006: 150
 Population in 2001: 85 (adjusted for boundary changes)

See also
 List of unorganized territories in Quebec

References

Unorganized territories in Abitibi-Témiscamingue
Témiscamingue Regional County Municipality